St. Dympna's Hospital is a psychiatric hospital located in Carlow, County Carlow, Ireland.

History
The hospital, which was designed by Francis Johnston, opened as the Carlow District Lunatic Asylum in 1832. It became Carlow Mental Hospital in 1925 and, having been re-named St. Dympna's Hospital, after St. Dympna, the patron saint of mental illness, in 1958, it was taken over by the Department of Health in 1971. After the introduction of deinstitutionalisation in the late 1980s the hospital went into a period of decline. Kelvin Grove, a modern residential unit for adult clients with learning difficulties, opened on the site in 2008. The main hospital closed in October 2011.

Patient services
Services include out-patient clinics, day care facilities, addiction counselling, and a community hostel.

References

External links

Hospital buildings completed in 1832
Hospitals established in 1832
1832 establishments in Ireland
Dympnas
Health Service Executive hospitals
Hospitals in County Carlow